Apa Qaghan (Chinese: 阿波可汗, Chinese: Pinyin: ābō kěhàn, Wade-Giles: a-po k'o-han, Middle Chinese: (Guangyun) , personal name: 大邏便/大逻便, dàluóbiàn, ta-lo-pien, reigned: 581–587) was son of Muqan Qaghan, declared himself qaghan of the Turkic Khaganate. His claim of power came with the will of Taspar. He did not accept Ishbara Qaghan as rightful emperor, leading to Gokturk Civil War.

Life 
He allied himself with Tardu and Tamgan - sons of Istemi. However he soon lost most major battles and retreated to Bukhara. He died soon in 587. Succeeded by his younger brother, Yangsu Tegin.

References 

Göktürk khagans
Ashina house of the Turkic Empire